Faculty of Dental Sciences, University of Peradeniya is one of the nine faculties of University of Peradeniya and the only institution that offers five years undergraduate programme for dental surgeons in Sri Lanka. It conducts both undergraduate programs (Degree of Bachelor of Dental Surgery (BDS)) and postgraduate programs.

The only dental teaching hospital in Sri Lanka, the Peradeniya Dental (Teaching) Hospital functions as the clinical unit of the faculty. the Dental School of the University of Ceylon was established in 1943. It was moved from Colombo to Augusta Hill, Peradeniya in 1954. In 1974, Dental Schools was amalgamated into the Faculty of Medical, Dental & Veterinary Sciences of the Peradeniya Campus. The teaching hospital was declared open and integrated to the faculty in 1998 as a Rs. 1.2 billion project.

Departments

Department of Basic Sciences
Department of Community Dental Health
Department of Oral Medicine & Periodontology
Department Oral and Maxillofacial Surgery
Department of Oral Pathology
Department of Prosthetic Dentistry
Department of Restorative Dentistry

Units
 Dental Auxiliary Training School (DATS)
 Unit for Development of Dental Education (UDDE)
 Dental E-Learning Unit (DELU)
 English Language Teaching Unit (ELTU)

Centers
 Center for Research in Oral Cancer (CROC)

Student Organizations 

 Dental Faculty Students' Union
 Buddhist Brotherhood Association

References

External links
 Official website

Dental Sciences